White Lightning is a 1973 American action film directed by Joseph Sargent, written by William W. Norton, and starring Burt Reynolds, Jennifer Billingsley, Ned Beatty, Bo Hopkins, R. G. Armstrong and Diane Ladd. It marked Laura Dern's film debut.

Plot
Bobby "Gator" McKlusky is incarcerated in an Arkansas state prison for running moonshine. When he learns that his younger brother, Donny, was killed by Bogan County Sheriff J. C. Connors, he attempts to escape, but is re-captured after a short time. Gator knows the sheriff is taking money from local moonshiners, so he agrees to go undercover for an unnamed federal agency (presumably the IRS or BATF) to try to expose the sheriff. But Gator has an ulterior motive for going after the sheriff, wanting revenge for his brothers murder. He has no intention of gathering evidence against any moonshiners.

The Feds give him a super-charged Ford LTD, and direct him to contact Dude Watson, a local stock car racer and low-level whiskey runner, who has no choice but to cooperate because he is already on probation. To infiltrate the local moonshine industry, Dude introduces Gator to Roy Boone, one of the counties top runners who works for moonshine producer Big Bear, who is also Sheriff Connors enforcer. Gator starts an affair with Boone's girlfriend, Lou, and earns the trust of Roy and Big Bear as he slowly plots his revenge against the sheriff.

When the sheriff discovers Gator is working for the federal government, Connors sends Big Bear after him. Barely escaping with his life, Gator hides with Lou at Sister Linda's Home for Unwed Mothers. Gator knows the Feds will want evidence against the sheriff and the moonshiners, but Connors men find him first. Gator escapes in his LTD, and intentionally goads Connors into pursuing him. After a drawn out car chase, Gator tricks Connors into jumping his patrol car over an embankment and into the river. Connors drowns after his car sinks, as Gator watches him die. 

With Connors dead and no evidence against any of the moonshiners, the disappointed Feds escort Gator and Lou out of Bogan County as the sheriff's funeral procession passes nearby.

Cast
 Burt Reynolds as Bobby "Gator" McKlusky
 Jennifer Billingsley as Lou
 Ned Beatty as Sheriff J. C. Connors
 Bo Hopkins as Roy "Rebel Roy" Boone
 Matt Clark as "Dude" Watson
 Louise Latham as Martha Culpepper
 Diane Ladd as Maggie
 R. G. Armstrong as "Big Bear"
 Conlan Carter as Deputy
 Dabbs Greer as Pa McKlusky
 Lincoln Demyan as The Warden
 John Steadman as "Skeeter"
 Iris Korn as Ma McKlusky
 Stephanie Burchfield as Jenny
 Barbara Muller as Louella
 Laura Dern as Sharon Anne, Maggie's Daughter (uncredited)

Production
The film was originally called McKlusky. It was announced by Levy-Gardner-Laven in October 1971 as part of a seven-picture slate they intended to make for United Artists over two years. It was an original script by Norton, who often wrote for the producers. The villain of the script was based on the real life Sheriff Marlin Hawkins.

Reynolds' casting was announced in February 1972. He had worked with the writer and producers previously on Sam Whiskey (1969).

Reynolds called the film "the beginning of a whole series of films made in the South, about the South and for the South. No one cares if the picture was ever distributed north of the Mason-Dixon line because you could make back the cost of the negative just in Memphis alone. Anything outside of that was just gravy. It was a well done film. Joe Sargent is an excellent director. He's very, very good with actors. And it had some marvellous people in it whom nobody had seen before. Ned Beatty for example. I had to fight like hell to get Ned in the film."

The film was almost directed by Steven Spielberg, who had previously made three TV movies (1971's Duel, 1972's Something Evil and 1973's Savage) and decided to direct White Lightning the same year. "I spent two-and-a-half months on the film," said Spielberg, "met Burt once, found most of the locations and began to cast the movie, until I realized it wasn't something that I wanted to do for a first film. I didn't want to start my career as a hard-hat, journeyman director. I wanted to do something that was a little more personal." So he quit White Lightning and went to do Sugarland Express, which he found more challenging for three reasons, "the changing relationships among the trio in the car, the nature of 'the chase,' and how to handle the digressions."

Joseph Sargent signed to direct in May. Filming began July 15, 1972. Shooting took place in and around Little Rock, Arkansas. Hal Needham did stunts on the film.

The film's music was written by Charles Bernstein. Some of this score was also used by Quentin Tarantino in his 2003 film Kill Bill: Volume 1 and his 2009 film Inglourious Basterds. Bernstein's score was released by Intrada Records in May 2010.

Reception
The film has a score of 75% on Rotten Tomatoes based on 8 reviews.

Roger Greenspun of The New York Times called it "a fairly awful movie" with "endless car chases, which are a crushing bore." Variety characterized the film as "hit-and-miss," adding, "Reynolds is quite up to all the demands of his smashing role, as he forges toward his goal. Too often, though, too much footage is devoted to incidentals that detract." Gene Siskel of the Chicago Tribune gave the film three-and-a-half stars out of four and wrote that "what sets 'White Lightning' apart from a demolition derby is the special work of the entire cast in creating a totally believable world out of characters that we've seen countless times before ... Only an abrupt ending keeps 'White Lightning' from achieving some level of greatness." Charles Champlin of the Los Angeles Times called it "that scarce commodity, a stirring, satisfying summer-weight entertainment ... Reynolds delivers a varied, screen-commanding star turn which is a pleasure to watch." Gary Arnold of The Washington Post wrote that the film "begins straight and then starts messing around at random. The inevitable result is an expendable movie, neither straightforward crime melodrama nor consistent shaggy-dog comedy." Clyde Jeavons of The Monthly Film Bulletin declared, "Moonshine melodrama with a veneer of serious intent which is rapidly planed away by Burt Reynold's frivolous acting and Joseph Sargent's weakness for car chases."

A sequel, Gator, was released in 1976.

Legacy
On the TV series Archer, the film and its sequel are favorites of the title character, Sterling Archer, though he believes Gator to be the stronger installment. He gets the films easily confused, though, as he believes several key scenes from White Lightning to be in the sequel.

Reynolds later said the film "was a breakthrough in that area of blending comedy and action. And it made a lot of money, so other people began trying to do the same thing. They thought, 'Well, he smashed up sixty cars and it made a lot of money, so we'll do a hundred crashes.' But that had nothing to do with its success as a comedy."

See also
 List of American films of 1973

References

External links
 
 
 
 
 Encyclopedia of Arkansas History & Culture

1973 films
1970s action comedy films
American action comedy films
Films about alcoholic drinks
Films about automobiles
Films directed by Joseph Sargent
Films scored by Charles Bernstein
Films set in Arkansas
Films set in prison
United Artists films
1973 comedy films
Films about police corruption
Moonshine in popular culture
1970s English-language films
1970s American films